Heteroxenia is a genus of soft corals in the family Xeniidae.

Species
The World Register of Marine Species lists the following species:
Heteroxenia bauiana  May, 1900 
Heteroxenia elisabethae Kölliker, 1874 
Heteroxenia fuscescens (Ehrenberg, 1834) 
Heteroxenia ghardaquensis Gohar, 1940 
Heteroxenia lighti Roxas, 1933 
Heteroxenia medioensis Roxas, 1933 
Heteroxenia membranacea Schenk, 1896 
Heteroxenia mindorensis Roxas, 1933 
Heteroxenia minuta Roxas, 1933 
Heteroxenia palmae Roxas, 1933 
Heteroxenia philippinensis Roxas, 1933 
Heteroxenia pinnata Roxas, 1933 
Heteroxenia rigida (May, 1899) 
Heteroxenia uniserta (Kükenthal, 1902)

References

Xeniidae
Octocorallia genera